Seobu Bus Terminal Station is a station of a city railroad of Daegu Metro Line 1 in Nam-gu Daegu, South Korea. There is a large floating population because of the marketplace and clothing business around the terminal that is connected with Seobu Bus Terminal Station.

External links

 Cyber station information from Daegu Metropolitan Transit Corporation

Nam District, Daegu
Railway stations opened in 1997
Daegu Metro stations
Dalseo District